The General Electric CF6, US military designations F103 and F138, is a family of high-bypass turbofan engines produced by GE Aviation. Based on the TF39, the first high-power high-bypass jet engine, the CF6 powers a wide variety of civilian airliners. The basic engine core also powers the LM2500 and LM6000 marine and power generation turboshafts. It is gradually being replaced by the newer GEnx family.

Development

After developing the TF39 for the C-5 Galaxy in the late 1960s, GE offered a more powerful variant for civilian use, the CF6, and quickly found interest in two designs being offered for a recent Eastern Airlines contract, the Lockheed L-1011 and the McDonnell Douglas DC-10. Lockheed eventually selected the Rolls-Royce RB211, but the latter stuck with the CF6 and entered service in 1971. It was also selected for versions of the Boeing 747. Since then, the CF6 has powered versions of the Airbus A300, A310 and A330, Boeing 767, and McDonnell Douglas MD-11.

The high bypass of the CF6 represented a historic breakthrough in fuel efficiency.

By 2018, GE has delivered more than 8,300 CF6s: 480 -6s, 2,200 -50s, 4,400 -80C2s, more than 730 -80E; and 3,000 LM6000 industrial and marine derivatives.
The in-service fleet include 3,400 engines, more than all the GE90s and GEnx, generating over 600 shop visits per year.
GE will be delivering engines well into the 2020s and they will fly for 20 to 25 years, until 2045-50: more than 75 years since the first CF6.

As express delivery spurs an air cargo resurgence, Boeing plans to increase the CF6-80C2-powered 767 E-767 KC-767 delivery rate from 2.5 to 3 per month in 2020, a type introduced in 1982.
As CF6-80E1s are still delivered for the Airbus A330 and Airbus A330 MRTT, CF6 production will grow from 50 to 60-80 per year by 2020.
GE also studies reengining the Progress D-18-powered Antonov An-124 freighters with CargoLogicAir, a Volga-Dnepr subsidiary.
This would likely provide a range increase, and Volga-Dnepr Group operates 12 aircraft, implying a 50-60 engines with spares program.

Variants

CF6-6

The CF6-6 was a development of the military TF39. It was first used on the McDonnell Douglas DC-10-10.

This initial version of the CF6 has a single-stage fan with one core booster stage, driven by a 5-stage LP (low pressure) turbine, turbocharging a 16-stage HP (high pressure) axial compressor driven by a 2-stage HP turbine; the combustor is annular; separate exhaust nozzles are used for the fan and core airflows. The 86.4-in (2.19-m) diameter fan generates an airflow of 1,300 lb/s (590 kg/s), resulting in a relatively high bypass ratio of 5.72. The overall pressure ratio of the compression system is 24.3. At maximum take-off power, the engine develops a static thrust of 41,500 lb (185.05 kN).

Undeveloped variants
The General Electric CF6-32 was to be a lower thrust derivative of the CF6-6 for the Boeing 757.  In 1981, GE formally abandoned development of the engine, leaving the Boeing 757 engine market to Pratt & Whitney and Rolls-Royce.

CF6-50

The CF6-50 series are high-bypass turbofan engines rated between 51,000 and 54,000 lb (227.41 to 240.79 kN, or '25 tons') of thrust. The CF6-50 was developed into the LM5000 industrial turboshaft engines. It was launched in 1969 to power the long range McDonnell Douglas DC-10-30, and was derived from the earlier CF6-6.

Not long after the -6 entered service, an increase in thrust was required. It was obtained by increasing the mass flow through the core. Two booster stages were added to the LP (low pressure) compressor and the last two stages of the HP compressor were removed which increased the overall pressure ratio to 29.3. Although the 86.4 in (2.19 m) diameter fan was retained, the airflow was raised to 1,450 lb/s (660 kg/s), yielding a static thrust of 51,000 lbf (227 kN). The increase in core flow decreased the bypass ratio to 4.26.

In late 1969, the CF6-50 was selected to power the then new Airbus A300. Air France became the launch customer for the A300 by ordering six aircraft in 1971. In 1975, KLM became the first airline to order the Boeing 747 powered by the CF6-50. This led further developments to the CF6 family such as the CF6-80. The CF6-50 also powered the Boeing YC-14 USAF AMST transport prototype.

The basic CF6-50 engine was also offered with a 10% thrust derate for the 747SR, a short-range high-cycle version used by All Nippon Airways for domestic Japanese operations. This engine is termed the CF6-45.

The engine is designated the General Electric F103 in United States Air Force service on KC-10 Extenders and Boeing E-4s.

CF6-80

The CF6-80 series are high-bypass turbofan engines with a thrust range of 48,000 to 75,000 lb (214 to 334 kN).  Although the HP compressor still has 14 stages, GE did take the opportunity to tidy-up the design, by removing the empty air passage at compressor exit.

The -80 series is divided into four distinct models.

CF6-80A 
The CF6-80A, which has a thrust rating of 48,000 to 50,000 lb (214 to 222 kN), powered two twinjets, the Boeing 767 and Airbus A310. The GE-powered 767 entered airline service in 1982, and the GE powered A310 in early 1983. It is rated for ETOPS operations.

For the CF6-80A/A1, the fan diameter remains at 86.4 in (2.19 m), with an airflow of 1435 lb/s (651 kg/s). Overall pressure ratio is 28.0, with a bypass ratio of 4.66. Static thrust is 48,000 lbf (214 kN). The basic mechanical configuration is the same as the -50 series.

CF6-80C2 

For the CF6-80C2-A1, the fan diameter is increased to 93 in (2.36 m), with an airflow of 1750 lb/s (790 kg/s). Overall pressure ratio is 30.4, with a bypass ratio of 5.15. Static thrust is 59,000 lb (263 kN). An extra stage is added to the LP compressor, and a 5th to the LP turbine.

The CF6-80C2 is currently certified on fifteen commercial and military widebody aircraft models including the Boeing 747-400, and McDonnell Douglas MD-11. The CF6-80C2 is also certified for ETOPS-180 for the Airbus A300, Airbus A310, Boeing 767, KC-767A/J, E-767J, Kawasaki C-2, and (as the F138) the Lockheed C-5M Super Galaxy and VC-25A.

F138-100 

The F138-100 is a military designation of the CF6-80C2. This engine is a modification of the CF6-80C2 to produce 50,400–51,600 lbf, with Strict Noise Regulations and Green Emissions, specially and specifically designed for Lockheed Martin C-5M Super Galaxy

CF6-80E1

The CF6-80E1 has the highest thrust power of CF6-80 Series family, with the fan tip diameters increased to 96.2 in (2.443m), and an overall pressure ratio of 32.6 and bypass ratio of 5.3.   The  variant competes with the Rolls-Royce Trent 700 and the Pratt & Whitney PW4000 to power the Airbus A330.

Other variants

The industrial and marine development of the CF6-80C2, the LM6000 Series, has found wide use including fast ferry and high speed cargo ship applications, as well as in power generation. The LM6000 gas turbine family provides power in the 40 to 56 MW range for utility, industrial, and oil & gas applications.

Applications
 Airbus A300/Airbus Beluga 
 Airbus A310/Airbus A310 MRTT/Airbus CC-150 Polaris
 Airbus A330/Airbus A330 MRTT/EADS/Northrop Grumman KC-45
 Boeing 747/E-4/VC-25A
 Boeing 767/E-767/KC-767/E-10
 Boeing YC-14
 Kawasaki C-2
 Lockheed Martin C-5M Super Galaxy
 McDonnell Douglas DC-10/KC-10
 McDonnell Douglas MD-11

Accidents and incidents 

In 1973, a CF6-6 fan assembly disintegrated, resulting in the loss of cabin pressurization of National Airlines Flight 27 over New Mexico, United States.

In 1979 a CF6-6 engine detached from the left wing of American Airlines Flight 191, severing hydraulic lines and causing the aircraft to crash.

In 1989, a CF6-6 fan disk separated from the engine and damaged all three hydraulic systems. The flight, United Airlines Flight 232, continued with no hydraulic power until it crash-landed at the airport in Sioux City, Iowa.

In 2000, the National Transportation Safety Board (NTSB) warned that the high-pressure compressor could crack.

Following a series of high-pressure turbine failures on 6 September 1997, 7 June 2000 and 8 December 2002, and resulting in 767s being written off on 22 September 2000, on 2 June 2006, and on 28 October 2016, the Federal Aviation Administration issued an airworthiness directive mandating inspections for over 600 engines and the NTSB believed that this number should be increased to include all -80 series engines with more than 3000 cycles since new or since last inspection.

In May 2010, The NTSB warned that the low-pressure turbine rotor disks could fail. Four uncontained failures of CF6-45/50 engines in the preceding two years prompted it to issue an "urgent" recommendation to increase inspections of the engines on U.S. aircraft : none of the four incidents of rotor disk imbalance and subsequent failure resulted in an accident, but parts of the engine did penetrate the engine housing in each case.

Specifications

See also

References

External links

 
 
 

High-bypass turbofan engines
CF6
1970s turbofan engines